The quartz gecko (Pachydactylus latirostris) is a species of lizard in the family Gekkonidae. It is found in southwestern Africa.

References

Pachydactylus
Reptiles described in 1923